In climatology, the so-called "8.2-kiloyear event" was a sudden decrease in global temperatures that occurred approximately 8,200 years before the present (BP), that is,  6,251 BC. It defines the start of the Northgrippian age in the Holocene epoch. Milder than the Younger Dryas cold period before it but more severe than the Little Ice Age after it, the 8.2-kiloyear cooling was a significant exception to general trends of the Holocene climatic optimum. During the event, atmospheric methane concentration decreased by 80 ppb, an emission reduction of 15%, by cooling and drying at a hemispheric scale.

Identification
A rapid cooling around 6200 BC was first identified by Swiss botanist Heinrich Zoller in 1960, who named the event the Misox oscillation (for the Val Mesolcina). It is also known as the Finse event in Norway. Bond et al. argued that the origin of the 8.2-kiloyear event is linked to a 1,500-year climate cycle; it correlates with Bond event 5.

The strongest evidence for the event comes from the North Atlantic region; the disruption in climate shows clearly in Greenland ice cores and in sedimentary and other records of the temperate and the tropical North Atlantic. It is less evident in ice cores from Antarctica and in South American indices. The effects of the sudden temperature decrease were global, however, most notably in changes in sea level.

Cooling event
The event may have been caused by a large meltwater pulse from the final collapse of the Laurentide Ice Sheet of northeastern North America, most likely when the glacial lakes Ojibway and Agassiz suddenly drained into the North Atlantic Ocean. The same type of action produced the Missoula floods that formed the Channeled Scablands of the Columbia River basin. The meltwater pulse may have affected the North Atlantic thermohaline circulation, reducing northward heat transport in the Atlantic and causing significant North Atlantic cooling. Estimates of the cooling vary and depend somewhat on the interpretation of the proxy data, but decreases of around  have been reported. In Greenland, the event started at 8175 BP, and the cooling was 3.3 °C (decadal average) in less than 20 years. The coldest period lasted for about 60 years, and its total duration was about 150 years. The meltwater causation hypothesis is, however, considered to be speculation because of inconsistencies with its onset and an unknown region of impact.

Researchers suggest that the discharge was probably superimposed upon a longer episode of cooler climate lasting up to 600 years, and it was merely one contributing factor to the event as a whole.

Further afield from the Laurentide Ice Sheet, some tropical records report a  cooling, based on cores drilled into an ancient coral reef in Indonesia. The event also caused a global CO2 decline of about 25 ppm over about 300 years. However, dating and interpretation of other tropical sites are more ambiguous than the North Atlantic sites. In addition, climate modeling work shows that the amount of meltwater and the pathway of meltwater are both important in perturbing the North Atlantic thermohaline circulation.

Based on estimates of lake volume and decaying ice cap size, values of  circulate. Based on sea-level data from the Mississippi Delta, the end of the Lake Agassiz–Ojibway (LAO) drainage occurred at 8.31 to 8.18 ka and ranges from 0.8 to 2.2 m. Meltwater pulse sea-level rise was experienced fully at great distance from the release area. Gravity and rebound effects associated with the shifting of water masses meant that the sea-level fingerprint was smaller in areas closer to the Hudson Bay. The Mississippi Delta records around 20%, Northwestern Europe 70% and Asia records 105% of the globally averaged amount. The cooling of the 8.2-kiloyear event was a temporary feature, but the sea-level rise of the meltwater pulse was permanent.

In 2003, the Office of Net Assessment (ONA) at the United States Department of Defense was commissioned to produce a study on the likely and potential effects of a modern climate change. The study, conducted under ONA head Andrew Marshall, modeled its prospective climate change on the 8.2-kiloyear event, precisely because it was the middle alternative between the Younger Dryas and the milder Little Ice Age.

North Africa and Mesopotamia
Drier conditions were notable in North Africa, and East Africa was significantly affected by five centuries of general drought. In West Asia, especially Mesopotamia, the 8.2-kiloyear event was a 300-year aridification and cooling episode, which may have provided the natural force for Mesopotamian irrigation agriculture and surplus production, which were essential for the earliest formation of classes and urban life. However, changes taking place over centuries around the period are difficult to link specifically to the approximately 100-year abrupt event, as recorded most clearly in the Greenland ice cores.

In particular, in Tell Sabi Abyad, Syria, significant cultural changes are observed at c. 6200 BC; the settlement was not abandoned at the time.

Northern Europe

In western Scotland, the 8.2 kiloyear event coincided with a dramatic reduction in the Mesolithic population.

See also 

 4.2-kiloyear event
 5.9-kiloyear event
 African humid period
 Antarctic Cold Reversal
 Bond event
 Little Ice Age
 Older Peron
 Piora Oscillation
 Sahara pump theory
 Sea level rise
 Storegga Slide
 Younger Dryas

References

External links 

History of climate variability and change
7th millennium BC